The 2019 Louisiana Tech Bulldogs football team represented Louisiana Tech University in the 2019 NCAA Division I FBS football season. The Bulldogs played their home games at Joe Aillet Stadium in Ruston, Louisiana, and competed in the West Division of Conference USA (C-USA). They were led by seventh-year head coach Skip Holtz.

Previous season
The Bulldogs finished the 2018 campaign 8–5, 5–3 in C-USA play to finish in third place in the West Division. The Bulldogs were invited to play in the Hawaii Bowl, their first time taking part in the annual Honolulu, Hawaii bowl game. They defeated hometown Hawaii and won their seventh overall bowl game by the score of 31-14.

Preseason

CUSA media poll
Conference USA released their preseason media poll on July 16, 2019, with the Bulldogs predicted to finish in third place in the West Division.

Preseason All-Conference USA teams
2019 Preseason All-Conference USA

Roster

Schedule
Louisiana Tech announced its 2019 football schedule on January 10, 2019. The 2019 schedule consists of 6 home and away games in the regular season.

Game summaries

at Texas

Grambling State

at Bowling Green

FIU

at Rice

UMass

Southern Miss

at UTEP

North Texas

at Marshall

at UAB

UTSA

vs. Miami (FL) (Independence Bowl)

Players drafted into the NFL

Undrafted free agents include: J'Mar Smith, signed by the New England Patriots

References

Louisiana Tech
Louisiana Tech Bulldogs football seasons
Independence Bowl champion seasons
Louisiana Tech Bulldogs football